Parliamentary elections were held in Portugal on 19 October 1879. The result was a landslide victory for the Progressive Party, which won 106 seats.

Results

The results exclude the seats from overseas territories.

References

Legislative elections in Portugal
Portugal
1879 in Portugal
October 1879 events